The third season of American reality competition television series World of Dance premiered on February 26, 2019, on NBC. Ne-Yo, and Derek Hough returned as the judges for their third consecutive seasons. Access Hollywood co-host Scott Evans replaced Jenna Dewan as the new host.

Production

Format changes
The required qualifier score to enter the duels increased from 80 to 85. The duels feature a redemption round where the Top 2 eliminated acts (in each division) with the highest score compete head to head for a second chance to advance to The Cuts. In the redemption, the 2 acts compete back to back to the same music. Afterwards, the judges vote to decide which act will advance.

In the Divisional Final, the judges pick one more act to advance to the World Final as a wild card. In the World Final, each act performs once instead of twice.

The guest judge is removed this season.

Show concept
In preparation for season three, handpicked competitors, being talented in any styles of dancing, from qualifying events around the nation and thousands of online submissions, are divided into four  divisions: 
 Junior (groups of 1-4, under 18), 
 Upper (groups of 1-4, 18 and older), 
 Junior Team (groups of 5+, under 18) and 
 Upper Team (groups of 5+, 18 and older). 
In some cases dancers who didn't apply were directly contacted by the producers or their agents.

Scoring
The judges are scoring in 5 categories. Each category is worth 20 points, with a perfect score of 100: 
 Performance (20 points): :)
 Effort: How many different elements put into the routine without overloading or rushing through it. What was the whole effort to dance the performance by the act.
 Personality: How characters and personality put into the performance, in the sense of acting to stimulate emotions by the audience, telling a story or framing pictures.
 Technique  (20 points):
 Transitions: How smooth and elegant the transitions from move to move were without lacking a performance moment.
 Cleanness: How synchronized, ordered by a pattern, precise and committed the movements were within the act.  
 Execution: How flawless the execution of the performance by the act was to the performance song. 
 Choreography  (20 points):
 Difficulty: How difficult it was to perform the figures and movements by the act from judges point of view.
 Musicality: How well pictures, figures and movements were choreographed to the sound and beat of the performance song.
 Tricks: Are unexpected show elements included by properties, clothing or the bodies of the dancers and how well was it done. 
 Creativity  (20 points):
 Originality: How unique, new, fresh and interesting was the performance. 
 Artistic Choices: What styles of dancing were shown and merged. How well was it done regarding basic dance styles and style culture, e.g. costumes, shoes. The performance song and the use of properties are artistic choices as well. How well did they fit to the performance.
 Dynamics: How energizing and powerful the performance was and how much action was on stage.  
 Presentation  (20 points):
 Crowd Appeal: How the crowd around the show stage reacted to the performance.
 Impact: How memorable, influential and worth talking about it later the performance was.

Judges, host, and mentors

Jennifer Lopez, Ne-Yo, and Derek Hough returned as the judges for their third consecutive season. Access Live co-host, Scott Evans replaced original presenter Jenna Dewan as the host for the third season. Evans became the first male host of the show and the first host/judge to be on the show with no prior dancing experience.

This season there were only two mentors in two different rounds. Original host Jenna Dewan, returned as a mentor for the Junior teams in the round of The Cut. Hip hop dancer, choreographer, entertainer, and former So You Think You Can Dance contestant, Stephen "tWitch" Boss served as a mentor for the Divisional Final round.

Dancers

The Qualifiers
The qualifier round took place between February 26 and March 10, 2019. In season 3, the number of points you need to advance to The Duels is now 85. While seasons 1 and 2, the average points was 80. The qualifier round got harder to get past. Some people from last season would not make it this season.

The Duels
In each round of The Duels, two acts in the same division compete for a spot in The Cut. In each division, the acts with the top scores choose their opponents, then both acts perform back-to-back, receiving feedback from the judges. The act with the higher score moves on to The Cut; the other faces immediate elimination. New in season 3, at the end of each division, the 2 highest scoring eliminated acts will face off in Redemption. The 2 acts will dance to the same song back to back and the judges will decide who will take the last remaining spot in The Cut by majority vote.

The Duel Picks
Opponent selection proceeded according to rank within each division. Briar Nolet defeated Denise & Josh in the Upper Redemption Duel to advance. The Dancetown Divas defeated MKAM in the Junior Team Division Redemption Duel. Kayla Mak defeated House of Tap on the Junior Division Redemption Duel. Exiles defeated Motiv Crew in the Upper Team division.

Redemption

The Cut
In The Cut, the 24 remaining acts (6 in each division) compete for three spots in each of their divisions. As each dance act competes, their final score is displayed on a leaderboard for their division. Once a dance act's score falls out of the top 3, they face immediate elimination. For this round, each of the judges and special guest, former host, Jenna Dewan, acted as mentors for one of the four divisions;  Jenna worked with the Junior Teams, Derek worked with the Upper acts, Ne-Yo worked with the Upper Teams, and Jennifer worked with the Junior acts.

The Cut Scores

Divisional Final
In the Divisional Final, the 3 remaining acts in each division square off, with only one act going to the World Final to represent their division. Same as The Cut, each of the judges and special guest, Stephen "tWitch" Boss, became mentors for one of the four divisions. Jennifer mentored the Junior Teams, Derek worked with the Junior acts, Ne-Yo worked with the Upper acts, and tWitch worked with the Upper Teams. One act is also chosen as a Wildcard to compete in the World Finals.

World Final
In the World Final, the final 4 division champions plus 1 wildcard compete head to head to win the one million dollar prize.
Each team performs one routine and the highest scorer is adjudged the world champion.

Highest Scoring Dances

Ratings

References

External links
All full episodes can currently be watched on NBC World of Dance website, but only officially within the United States due to geographical restrictions

2019 American television seasons
Dance competition television shows